VOAR-FM (96.7 MHz) is a Canadian radio station, which airs a christian format. It is licensed to Mount Pearl, Newfoundland and Labrador, and serves the St. John's metropolitan area. VOAR is owned by the Seventh-day Adventist Church in Newfoundland & Labrador. Its radio studios and offices are on Topsail Road in Mount Pearl. The transmitter is off Kenmount Road, also in Mount Pearl.  The effective radiated power (ERP) is 100,000 watts.

VOAR airs a blend of Christian talk and teaching programs along with Contemporary Christian music. Religious leaders heard on VOAR include Charles Stanley, Jim Daly, Joni Eareckson Tada and Chuck Swindoll.

History

Early years
VOAR first began broadcasting in the fall of 1929 as 8BSL. In 1930, the station was renamed 8RA. It received the call sign VONA (Voice of the North Atlantic) in 1931 (using the ITU prefix VO that was assigned to the Dominion of Newfoundland before it joined Canada; it is one of four stations, alongside VOWR, VOCM, and VOCM-FM, to still use call signs beginning with VO rather than C).  It would rename itself VOAC (Voice of the Adventist Church) in 1933, then once more to its current call-sign, VOAR (Voice of Adventist Radio) in 1938.

Over the years, the station switched its frequency several times. From the 1950s through 1991, it broadcast at 1230 kHz, originally powered at only 100 watts.

It then moved to its final AM frequency, 1210, getting a boost in power to 10,000 watts, which was approved by the Canadian Radio-television and Telecommunications Commission (CRTC) in 1991. But because 1210 is a clear channel frequency reserved for Class A WPHT Philadelphia, VOAR used a directional antenna to avoid interference. It later moved its city of license from St. John's to Mount Pearl, the community where its transmitter and studios are located.

Expanding through Canada
In 2002, VOAR began adding a network of FM rebroadcasters, while the main station was still being heard on the AM band in St. John's. At first, the rebroadcasting stations were in small communities around Newfoundland and Labrador.

In recent years, VOAR has expanded into other provinces and territories. It currently has about 30 rebroadcasters, stretching across Canada. It is heard in four provinces and in the Northwest Territories.

Moving to FM

On October 6, 2016, the CRTC received an application from VOAR to move to the FM band, with the call sign VOAR-FM. The proposed new station would have an effective radiated power (ERP) of 100,000 watts. At the same time, it would shut down its AM signal and its Bay Roberts repeater, VOAR-1-FM 95.9. The other VOAR repeaters would become simulcast the new FM signal. Reasons for the conversion request stated in the application were listener confusion with VOWR (both stations receive each other's mail), signal reception issues in portions of the St. John's area, and the AM station's transmitter (installed in 1990) reaching the end of its usable life.

On June 27, 2017, the CRTC approved VOAR's application to replace its religious AM radio station VOAR and its rebroadcaster in Bay Roberts. The new FM station in Mount Pearl would operate at 96.7 MHz with an ERP of 100,000 watts using a non-directional antenna at a height above average terrain (HAAT) of 156.8 metres. VOAR began testing its new FM transmitter in St. John's in December 2018. It officially signed on the air the following month.

On December 2, 2019, VOAR completed its transitions to FM, giving it a power of 100,000 watts. The station's moniker became Lighthouse FM. On January 10, 2020, the AM signal would officially be shut down.

Rebroadcasters
In 2002, VOAR added several FM rebroadcasters in various parts of the province, too far from St. John's to get a clear signal from the AM transmitter. Over the years, other rebroadcasters were added in other Canadian provinces and territories. VOAR is also carried across Canada on Bell Satellite TV Channel 950 and locally on Rogers Cable Channel 929.

A new broadcasting license was issued in 2008. Also in 2008, several transmitters were put on the air in British Columbia.

The station also had repeaters in Prince George, British Columbia 107.3 (VF2510); Kamloops 105.1 (VF2525); Kelowna 98.9; and Oliver 106.1 (VF2524), but they were taken off the air due to licensing issues with the CRTC in January 2009. The station also had applications to expand into 25 additional communities in British Columbia in early 2009.

References

External links 
VOAR
VOAR history - Canadian Communications Foundation

Radio stations in St. John's, Newfoundland and Labrador
Christian radio stations in Canada
Seventh-day Adventist media
Mount Pearl
Radio stations established in 1929